quip is a Brooklyn, New York-based startup that sells electric toothbrushes and other oral hygiene products. It was founded in February 2015 by Simon Enever and Bill May and officially launched that November. In November 2017, it raised $10 million in series A venture capital funding from prominent investors such as Demi Lovato and Sherpa Capital. A subsequent round of funding brought the company a further $40 million from Sherpa Capital in November 2018. This funding was announced shortly after quip began selling their toothbrushes in Target stores rather than only through an online subscription. By January 2019, the company had sold over 1 million toothbrushes and gained over 1 million subscribers.

Products

Toothbrushes

Electric toothbrushes
Available in plastic (blue, green, and magenta) and metal (copper, gold, silver, and slate). Limited editions were also produced by Quip in metal (all-pink, dark aqua, and light aqua). In 2018, quip collaborated with charity organization (PRODUCT)RED to produce an exclusive metal (RED) variant, with 15% of sales donated directly towards the Global Fund's programs. In June 2022, quip created a limited edition pride metal variant, with each brush featuring a unique rainbow gradient. A total of $50,000 was donated from the sales towards the Ali Forney Center to support homeless lgbt+ youth. Also in 2022, quip ran a contest to create a one of a kind brush featuring any design the winner requested.

Smart electric toothbrushes
Available in plastic (all-white) and metal (all-black and all-pink).

Rechargeable electric toothbrushes
Available in plastic (midnight blue).

Smart rechargeable electric toothbrushes
Available in plastic (ocean blue and sky blue) and metal (all-black and all-pink).

Kids electric toothbrushes
Available in rubber (blue, green, pink, and purple).

Kids smart electric toothbrushes
Available in rubber (all-yellow).

Toothpaste
Available in mint and watermelon flavors. Mint flavored travel size toothpaste is also available.

Floss
Quip produces mint flavored floss for use in both floss picks and floss string. They are both available in plastic (white) and metal (all-black, copper, gold, silver, and slate). The floss pick is also available in metal (all-pink). The floss is mint flavored and refillable. Quip also produces a water flosser in plastic (sky blue and white) and metal (all-black, copper, and slate).

Mouthwash
Dispensers are available in plastic (white) and metal (all-black, all-pink, copper, gold, silver, and slate). The mouthwash is mint flavored and refillable. The dispensers operate by a push button.

Gum
Dispensers are available in plastic (white) and metal (all-black, all-pink, copper, gold, silver, and slate). The gum is mint flavored, sugar free, refillable, and comes in packs of 90, 180, or 270 pieces.

References

External links

American companies established in 2015
Companies based in Brooklyn
Oral hygiene
2015 establishments in New York City
Subscription services